Trånghalla is a village situated in Jönköping Municipality, Jönköping County, Sweden with 1,251 inhabitants in 2005.

References 

Populated places in Jönköping County